Fig was a crowdfunding platform for video games. It launched in August 2015. Unlike traditional crowdfunding approaches like Kickstarter, where individuals can back a project to receive rewards, Fig used a mixed model that includes individual backing and the opportunity for uncredited investors to invest as to obtain a share of future revenues for successful projects. At the end of 2017, four projects had begun generating returns, returning 245% to Fig investors.

History
Fig was founded in August 2015 by Justin Bailey (formerly, COO of Double Fine Productions), and Bob Ippolito. The advisory board is composed of executives from across the video game industry with previous experience in crowdfunding and investing in video game projects: Aaron Isaksen of the Indie Fund, Brian Fargo of inXile Entertainment, Feargus Urquhart of Obsidian Entertainment, and Tim Schafer of Double Fine Productions. The platform is backed by funding from Spark Capital. Alex Rigopulos, from Harmonix, and Cliff Bleszinski, formerly of Epic Games and Boss Key Productions, and Randy Pitchford of Gearbox Software have since joined the advisory board of Fig.

The company was initially backed by seed funding from Spark Capital. In January 2017, it obtained another $7.84 million in funding from Spark and Greycroft Partners, among other smaller investors.

In February 2017, Fig announced it has established a "Fig Finishing Fund" available to those projects that have been successfully backed on Fig as to help complete any late-stage development hurdles or final publishing and marketing pushes. Should projects qualify, they will be able to obtain at $20,000 from the Finishing Fund. 

In 2017, Fig set aside $500,000 of its own funds available for the Finishing Fund pool.

The name "Fig" derives from Hotel Figueroa, located along Figueroa Street, a short distance from the Los Angeles Convention Center where the annual Electronic Entertainment Expo is traditionally held; Hotel Figueroa became a common social hub during these E3 events.

Fig was acquired by Republic, a larger crowdfunding investment company, in April 2020. Fig will continue to operate as it has under Republic, though there will be opportunities to access more investors for projects through Republic's investment capital as a result. This allowed Fig to open up to more expansive campaigns including those related to hardware; with the announcement of the Republic acquisition, for example, Fig launched the campaign to allow crowdfunding or investment into the Intellivision Amico microconsole. After acquisition, Justin Bailey remained as a board member at Republic to help the post-merger integration.

Approach
Fig is offered as an alternative means for funding video game development from traditional crowdfunding sites like Kickstarter. The goal of Fig is to allow not only the traditional backing of a video game as with normal crowdfunding, but to also enable those that can invest in a game's development to receive a portion of the game's profits once it is released, in addition to other typical rewards that crowdfunded projects allow. During their initial growth period, Fig limited investors in such projects to those that have accredited assets of over $1 million, with plans that once off the ground, anyone will be able to contribute and invest in their offered projects.

Due to the Jumpstart Our Business Startups Act which changed how the Security and Exchange Commission (SEC) treated crowdfunding, Fig will allow anyone to invest at a minimum of $1,000 into future campaigns starting in December 2015. However, there were initially some issues with gaining SEC approval to collect funds from unaccredited investors, holding up the funding for some of the campaigns after this point such as Psychonauts 2, and Fig has been supplying the requested funds to developers through internal support and investment. In September 2016, the SEC approved Fig's plan allowing unaccredited investors to purchase Fig Game Shares once campaigns have succeeded. While future campaigns will also require their SEC review for unaccredited investors, work for establishing the mechanism for the Psychonauts 2 campaign by Fig and its legal firm should streamline these subsequent reviews. Fig had adapted a plan to account for unaccredited investors that may opt to not providing the funding during the course of a SEC review; Fig will still provide the full amount of money committed at the time of the campaign to the developers, and will hold any unpaid unaccredited share for sale that others can subsequently purchase as to otherwise keep the same percentages of equity between accredited and unaccredited shareholders.

The concept for allowing investments of this nature resulted from the advisory board members' previous experience with Kickstarter campaigns, in which those that backed at the largest amounts typically were the least disruptive of the development process as they likely had the most trust in the game developer to complete the title as offered, according to Bailey. They also took inspiration from the success of Oculus VR, the company formed to develop their Oculus Rift virtual reality hardware through a $2.5 million Kickstarter campaign and eventually was sold to Facebook for $2 billion. Bailey believes that the most invested fans of such projects should be able to have a portion of those profits for a highly successful title.

Because Fig uses both traditional backing as well as investment support, potential investors will be able to judge on a project's viability based on how many backers the project has accrued, which can help derisk their investment. According to Schafer, he hopes that this will create a reputation for games that would fall somewhere between AAA titles and indie games, allowing for smaller teams to develop games with larger budgets (on the order of millions of dollars) that normally require large publication deals. Schafer also felt that with average crowd-funding projects typically seeking funds via Kickstarter, there is a growing fatigue in the area, where only certain niche projects, such as "Exploding Kittens", gain attention, and considered Fig a means to counter that fatigue for games that did not fit those niches.

Fig's approach is designed to support only one or two campaigns at a time, in contrast to the volume that are offered by Kickstarter or other crowdfunding services. Projects will be curated by Fig for viability and interest before they are supported, and will allow them to customize the website's project page for the game title to enhance its appeal. Fig may expand to have more concurrent projects if the platform proves successful. Fig will not require projects to accept investment support as long they offer typical backing options. As part of their support, Fargo, Urquhart, and Schafer have said that all future games developed by their respective studios will use Fig-based funding.

Fig created a secondary monetization approach "Open Access" in May 2019 that is based on the early access release approach. After a game's initial funding is complete, users are still able to contribute to the game's funding under this Open Access period, running from as short as 30 days after the initial Fig investment period up to as late as the game's full release, gaining access to early builds of the game and other backer features.

Games funded

References

External links
 

Crowdfunding platforms of the United States
Video game companies of the United States
Companies based in San Francisco
2015 in video gaming
Internet properties established in 2015
American companies established in 2015
Video game companies established in 2015
2015 establishments in California
2020 mergers and acquisitions